715 Naval Air Squadron (715 NAS) was a Naval Air Squadron of the Royal Navy Fleet Air Arm created on 15 July 1936 to serve as a Catapult Flight of the Fleet Air Arm of the RAF. It was elevated to Squadron status at the end of 1937, before being disbanded on 21 January 1940. It was re-formed on 17 August 1944 to operate as the Fighter Wing of the School of Air Combat, before being disbanded for good on 31 March 1946, and absorbed into 736 Naval Air Squadron.

History

Initial Formation 

The Flight originally came into being following a renumbering of the No. 403 (Catapult) Flight and operated in the 5th Cruiser Squadron in the China Station under the command of Lt. Cdr E. O. F. Price, RN. Its shore-based headquarters was at Kai Tak Airport, Hong Kong, but it also had a satellite at Wei-Hai-Wei, China.

The Flight was initially equipped with Hawker Osprey III seaplanes and was stationed aboard the County-class Cruisers HMS Berwick, HMS Dorsetshire, and HMS Kent. it was re-equipped with Supermarine Walruses in September 1936, and the last Osprey III left the Flight in July 1937.

In 1937, HMS Berwick and HMS Kent left the 5th Cruiser Squadron for major refits, and the Flight was rebased onto HMS Birmingham, HMS Cornwall, HMS Cumberland, and HMS Suffolk. At the end of this year, it was elevated from Flight to Squadron status.

On 24 May 1939 the Squadron was transferred to the Admiralty control, and operated from shore bases at Kai Tak and Seletar with 7 Supermarine Walruses on 5 Cruisers.

The Squadron was disbanded at RAF Kai Tak on 21 January 1940 when all Catapult Squadrons were merged into No. 700 Squadron.

Re-formation 
On 17 August 1944 the Squadron was re-formed at RNAS St. Merryn to operate Fighter Air Combat Instructor and Fighter Leaders Courses, under the command of Lt. Cdr (A) R.E. Gardner DSC, RNVR.

They used a collection of planes including the Supermarine Spitfire, Supermarine Seafire, and Vought F4U Corsair but also had access to a few Miles M.9 Master and North American Harvard IIB trainer aircraft.

On 12 December 1944 the command was passed on to Lt. Cdr D.G. Carlisle DSC, SANF(V), and then to Lt. Cdr F.R.A. Turnbull DSC & Bar RN on 28 June 1945.

Following the end of the Second World War training continued for several months, but on 31 March 1946 the Squadron was disbanded for the final time and reabsorbed into No. 736 Squadron.

Aircraft Operated 
The squadron operated a variety of different aircraft and versions:

 Osprey III/SP 
 Walrus I
 Master II
 Corsair III
 Corsair IV
 Seafire VA
 Seafire lB 
 Seafire III 
 Seafire XVII
 Harvard IlB
 Harvard III

References

Citations

Bibliography

700 series Fleet Air Arm squadrons
Military units and formations established in 1936
Military units and formations of the Royal Navy in World War II
1936 establishments in the United Kingdom